In optics, the corpuscular theory of light states that light is made up of small discrete particles called "corpuscles" (little particles) which travel in a straight line with a finite velocity and possess impetus. This was based on an alternate description of atomism of the time period.

Isaac Newton laid the foundations for this theory through his work in optics.  This early conception of the particle theory of light was an early forerunner to the modern understanding of the photon. This theory came to dominate the conceptions of light in the eighteenth century, displacing the previously prominent vibration theories, where light was viewed as 'pressure' of the medium between the source and the receiver, first championed by René Descartes, and later in a more refined form by Christiaan Huygens. It would fall out of the spotlight in the early nineteenth century, as the wave theory of light amassed new experimental evidence.

Mechanical philosophy

In the early 17th century, natural philosophers began to develop new ways to understand nature gradually replacing Aristotelianism, which had been for centuries the dominant scientific theory, during the process known as the Scientific Revolution. Various European philosophers adopted what came to be known as mechanical philosophy sometime between around 1610 to 1650, which described the universe and its contents as a kind of large-scale mechanism, a philosophy that explained the universe is made with matter and motion. This mechanical philosophy was based on Epicureanism, and the work of Leucippus and his pupil Democritus and their atomism, in which everything in the universe, including a person's body, mind, soul and even thoughts, was made of atoms; very small particles of moving matter. During the early part of the 17th century, the atomistic portion of mechanical philosophy was largely developed by Gassendi, René Descartes and other atomists.

Pierre Gassendi's atomist matter theory
The core of Pierre Gassendi's philosophy is his atomist matter theory. In his great work, Syntagma Philosophicum, ("Philosophical Treatise"), published posthumously in 1658, Gassendi tried to explain aspects of matter and natural phenomena of the world in terms of atoms and the void. He took Epicurean atomism and modified it to be compatible with Christian theology, by suggesting several key changes to it:

 God exists
 God created a finite number of indivisible and moving atoms
 God has a continuing divine relationship to creation (of matter)
 Humans have free will
 The human soul exists
 God was not born and will never die (God was always here and will always be)
Gassendi thought that atoms move in an empty space, classically known as  the void, which contradicts the Aristotelian view that the universe is fully made of matter. Gassendi also suggests that information gathered by the human senses has a material form, especially in the case of vision.

Corpuscular theories
Corpuscular theories, or corpuscularianism, are similar to the theories of atomism, except that in atomism the atoms were supposed to be indivisible, whereas corpuscles could in principle be divided. Corpuscles are single, infinitesimally small, particles that have shape, size, color, and other physical properties that alter their functions and effects in phenomena in the mechanical and biological sciences. This later led to the modern idea that compounds have secondary properties different from the elements of those compounds. Gassendi asserts that corpuscles are particles that carry other substances or substances and are of different types. These corpuscles are also emissions from various sources such as solar entities, animals, or plants. Robert Boyle was a strong proponent of corpuscularianism and used the theory to exemplify the differences between a vacuum and a plenum, by which he aimed to further support his mechanical philosophy and overall atomist theory. About a half-century after Gassendi, Isaac Newton used existing corpuscular theories to develop his particle theory of the physics of light.

Isaac Newton

Isaac Newton worked on optics throughout his research career, conducting various experiments and developing hypotheses to explain his results.  He dismissed Descartes' theory of light because he rejected Descartes’ understanding of space, which derived from it. With the publication of Opticks in 1704, Newton for the first time took a clear position supporting a corpuscular interpretation, though it would fall on his followers to systemise the theory. In the book, Newton argued that the geometric nature of reflection and refraction of light could only be explained if light were made of particles because waves do not tend to travel in straight lines. 

Newton's corpuscular theory was an elaboration of his view of reality as interactions of material points through forces. Note Albert Einstein's description of Newton's conception of physical reality:

[Newton's] physical reality is characterised by concepts of space, time, the material point and force (interaction between material points).  Physical events are to be thought of as movements according to the law of material points in space. The material point is the only representative of reality in so far as it is subject to change. The concept of the material point is obviously due to observable bodies; one conceived of the material point on the analogy of movable bodies by omitting characteristics of extension, form, spatial locality, and all their 'inner' qualities, retaining only inertia, translation, and the additional concept of force. Maxwell's influence on the development of the conception of physical reality , Albert Einstein, in James Clerk Maxwell: A Commemorative Volume 1831-1931 (Cambridge, 1931), pp. 66–73

 Every source of light emits large numbers of tiny particles known as corpuscles in a medium surrounding the source.
 These corpuscles are perfectly elastic, rigid, and weightless.

Eighteenth century

The dominance of Newtonian natural philosophy in the eighteenth century was one of the decisive factors ensuring the prevalence of the corpuscular theory of light. Newtonians maintained that the corpuscles of light were projectiles that travelled from the source to the receiver with a finite speed. In this description, the propagation of light is transportation of matter. By the turn of the century, however, more evidence in the form of novel experiments on diffraction, interference, and polarization showcased issues with the theory. A wave theory based on Huygens’, Leonard Euler's, Thomas Young's, and Augustin-Jean Fresnel's work would materialise in a novel wave theory of light.  To some extent, Newton's corpuscular (particle) theory of light re-emerged in the 20th century, as a light phenomenon is currently explained as particle and wave.

Polarization
The fact that light could be polarized was for the first time qualitatively explained by Newton using the particle theory. Étienne-Louis Malus in 1810 created a mathematical particle theory of polarization. Jean-Baptiste Biot in 1812 showed that this theory explained all known phenomena of light polarization. At that time polarization was considered proof of the particle theory. Nowadays, polarisation is considered a property of waves and may only manifest in transverse waves. Longitudinal waves may not be polarised.

See also
Corpuscularianism
Speed of gravity
Photon
Philosophy of physics
Opticks by Isaac Newton
The Skeptical Chemist by Robert Boyle

References

External links
Observing the quantum behavior of light in an undergraduate laboratory JJ Thorn et al.: Am. J. Phys. 72, 1210-1219 (2004)
Opticks, or, a Treatise of the Reflections, Refractions, Inflections, and Colours of Light. Sir Isaack Newton. 1704. Project Gutenberg book released 23 August 2010.
Pierre Gassendi. Fisher, Saul. 2009. Stanford Encyclopedia of Philosophy.
Isaac Newton. Smith, George. 2007. Stanford Encyclopedia of Philosophy.
Robert Boyle. MacIntosh, J.J. 2010. Stanford Encyclopedia of Philosophy.
Youtube video. Physics - Newton's corpuscular theory of light - Science. elearnin. Uploaded 5 Jan 2013.
Robert Hooke's Critique of Newton's Theory of Light and Colors (delivered 1672) Robert Hooke. Thomas Birch, The History of the Royal Society, vol. 3 (London: 1757), pp. 10–15. Newton Project, University of Sussex.
Corpuscule or Wave. Xaporia. 2022. Xaporia.

Obsolete theories in physics
Isaac Newton
Natural philosophy